Varegah-e Sofla (also Romanized as Vāregah-e Soflá; also known as Sarcheleh Vāregah-e Soflá and Vāregah) is a village in Cheleh Rural District, in the Central District of Gilan-e Gharb County, Kermanshah Province, Iran. At the 2006 census, its population was 347, in 83 families.

References 

Populated places in Gilan-e Gharb County